Coptodisca powellella is a moth of the family Heliozelidae. It was described by Opler in 1971. It is found in California.

The larvae feed on Quercus agrifolia. They mine the leaves of their host plant.

References

Moths described in 1971
Heliozelidae